Testudinalia is a genus of sea snails, the true limpets, marine gastropod mollusks in the family Lottiidae.

Species
Species within the genus Testudinalia include:

 Testudinalia tessulata Müller, 1776: synonym of Testudinalia testudinalis (O. F. Müller, 1776)
 Testudinalia testudinalis (Müller, 1776)

References

Lottiidae